This is a list of World War II weapons used by Finland. Finland fought in three conflicts during World War II; the Winter War (1939–1940), the Continuation War (1941–1944), and the Lapland War (1944–1945).

Small arms

Sidearms 
 Astra 300
 Beholla Pistol
 Beretta 1917
 Beretta 1922
 Beretta 1934
 Beretta 1935
 Browning Hi-Power
 Colt 1911
 FN 1900
 FN 1903
 FN 1910
 Husqvarna 1907
 Lahti L-35
 M/23 parabellum pistol (Luger pistol)
 Mauser 1914
 Mauser C96
 Nagant M1895
 Ruby
 TT-33
 VZ 24
 VZ 38
 Walther Model 4

Rifles 

AVS-36
Berdan rifle(Small amounts used by supply corps and homefronts troops)
Fedorov Avtomat(Captured from Soviets)
Karabiner 98k
Mosin–Nagant and Finnish variants
SVT-38
SVT-40
Winchester 1895

Submachine guns 

 Suomi KP/-31
 MP 18
 MP 28
 MP38 (Delivered with German vehicles)
 MP40 (Delivered with German vehicles)
 KP m/44 submachine gun
 PPD-34 (Captured)
 PPD-38 (Captured)
 PPD-40 (Captured)
 PPS-42 (Captured)
 PPS-43 (Captured)
 PPSh-41 (Captured)
 SIG M1920
 SIG MKMS

Machine guns 

 Lahti-Saloranta M/26
 Chauchat
 DS-39 (Captured)
Degtyaryov machine gun
FN Model D
Kg m/21
Lewis Gun (Limited used on aircraft and as anti-air guns)
Maxim M/1905
Maxim M/1910
Maxim M/09-21
 Maxim M/32-33
 MG08 (Used by coastal troops and on fortifications)
 Schwarzlose
 Vickers machine gun (Used by navy and home front troops)

Artillery

Field artillery 

 Canon de 75 modèle 1897
 Ehrhardt 7.5 cm Model 1901
76 mm gun M1900
76 mm divisional gun M1902
76 mm infantry gun Model 1913 & 76 LK/10/13 variants
Canon de 75 modèle 1922 Schneider
76 mm regimental gun M1927
76 mm divisional gun M1936 (F-22)
 87 mm light field gun M1877
De Bange 90 mm cannon
42-line field gun M1877
QF 4.5-inch howitzer
Canon de 105 mle 1913 Schneider
10.5 cm kanon m/34
107 mm gun M1910/30
122 mm howitzer M1910

Heavy Artillery 

 Type 38 15 cm howitzer
 152 mm howitzer M1910
 152 mm howitzer M1909/30
 Canon de 155 C modèle 1917 Schneider

Anti-tank weapons

Anti-tank guns 

 Bofors 37 mm anti-tank gun
 45 mm anti-tank gun M1937 (53-K)
 25 mm APX modèle 1937
 Madsen 20 mm cannon

Anti-tank rifles 

 Boys anti-tank rifle
 Lahti L-39
 PTRD-41 (Captured)
 PTRS-41 (Captured)
 Solothurn S-18/1000
 Solothurn S-18/154
 Wz. 35 anti-tank rifle

Shoulder-Fired weapons 

 Panzerfaust
 Panzerschreck

Other 

 Molotov cocktail

Armoured fighting vehicles(AFV)

Tanks 

 Renault FT
Carden Loyd tankette
Vickers 6-Ton
 T-26
 T-28
 BT-5
 BT-7
 BT-42
 T-34
 KV-1
 T-37A tank
 T-38 tank
 T-50 tank
 SU-76
 SU-152
 ISU-152
Panzer IVJ
Sturmgeschütz IIIG

Armoured cars 

 FAI armoured car

References

Finnish Army
Weapons of Finland